The eOdisha Summit 2013 was the first edition of the eOdisha Summit, a Conference, Exhibition and Awards Summit held on March 6, 2013 in Bhubaneswar, Odisha, India with themes of eGovernance, Information Technology (IT) and Healthcare. The eOdisha Summit 2013's Chief Guest was the Chief Minister of Odisha, Naveen Patnaik and the guest of honors were Dr. Damodar Rout, Minister of Health and Family Welfare, Government of Odisha and Ram Sewak Sharma, Director General and Mission Director of UIDAI.

eOdisha Awards

Jury
 Maj Gen Dr. R Siva Kumar, CEO, NSDI, Department of Science & Technology, Government of India 
 Vishal Dev, Chairman & MD, Odisha Industrial Infrastructure Development Corporation
 Gopal Krishna Naik, Director, International Institute of Information Technology, Bhubaneswar
 Manas Panda, Additional Director, Software Technology Parks of India, Bhubaneswar
 Aditya Mohapatra, Head, IT Promotion Cell, Odisha Computer Application Centre 
 Ravi Gupta, Editor-in-Chief, eGov

Awards

Speakers

Partners
Powered by: eGov 
Organisers: Elets Technomedia, Centre for Science, Development and Media Studies 
Hosting Partners: Department of IT, Government of Odisha, Odisha Computer Application Centre 
Knowledge Partner: Wipro 
Public Sector Undertaking (PSU) Partner: MSTC, National Aluminium Company 
Presenting Magazine: eGov 
Radio Partner: BIG FM 92.7 
Electronics Media Partner: ET Now

References

External links
 Official Website of eOdisha Summit 2013

Odisha
2013 conferences
Technology conferences
Business conferences in India
E-government in India